Far from Over may refer to:

Far from Over (Edwin McCain album), 2001
Far from Over (Vijay Iyer album), 2017
Far from Over, an EP by Frankmusik
"Far from Over" (Frank Stallone song), for the 1983 film Staying Alive
"Far from Over", a song by Rev Theory from the album Light It Up
"Far from Over", song by Anthony Callea from A New Chapter
"Far from Over", a 1999 song by Kamaya Painters
Far from Over, a 2000 novel by Sheila O'Flanagan